The LG Amsterdam Tournament 2007 was a pre-season football tournament contested by Ajax, Arsenal, Atlético Madrid and Lazio on 2 August and 4 August 2007 at the Amsterdam ArenA.

Table

NB: An extra point is awarded for each goal scored.

Results

Day 1

Day 2

External links
Official site

2007 
2007–08 in Dutch football
2007–08 in Spanish football
2007–08 in Italian football
2007–08 in English football

it:Torneo di Amsterdam#2007